Treat Conrad Huey and Dominic Inglot were the defending champions, but only Huey tries to defend his title. He played alongside Travis Parrott and they won the title, defeating Jordan Kerr and David Martin 6–2, 1–6, [16–14] in the final.

Seeds

  Stephen Huss /  Jamie Murray (first round)
  Treat Conrad Huey /  Travis Parrott (champion)
  Jordan Kerr /  David Martin (final)
  Vasek Pospisil /  Bobby Reynolds (semifinals, withdrew)

Draw

Draw

References
 Main Draw
 Qualifying Draw

Odlum Brown Vancouver Open
Vancouver Open